The Zastava NTV is a Serbian 4x4, multipurpose, all-terrain infantry mobility vehicle designed by the Military Technical Institute and Zastava Trucks, and manufactured by Zastava TERVO. The primary users are the Serbian Armed Forces; the vehicle may also be offered for the export market.

Design

The first prototype vehicle was designed in 2011 by the Military Technical Institute together with experts from the Faculty of Engineering of the University of Kragujevac and engineers of Zastava Trucks for the purpose of equipping the Serbian Armed Forces. It was designed with a modular chassis to transport troops and various equipment quickly on-road and off-road.

Thanks to modular chassis many different versions were developed from 2011 to 2017 and after extensive tests by the Technical Testing Center with 25,000 km tests in harsh conditions on and off-road vehicles were adopted for the Serbian Armed Forces and for exports. The vehicle has approach and departure angles of 35° each.

Vehicle can transport 1.4 tonnes of cargo and attach trailer with weight of 1.7 tones. For example, it could carry 32 wooden box with 64 120mm mortar mines that weights 1408 kg and tow 120mm mortar.

In basic variants has Cummins 2.8 turbocharged diesel engine with intake air cooler and 5-gear ZF 5S 400 synchronous mechanical gearbox. It is equipped with ABS, EBD and ABD for braking. It is configured as 4x4 with  permanent all-wheels drive with electric blockade command for separator drive and separate electric differential commands for front and rear bridge. It has 255/100 R16 radial tubeless tires with run flat as option.

Versions

There is three different versions of NTV:
40.13H - 2+1
40.13H Extended Cab - 8+1
40.13H - 5+1

Thanks to its modular design it could be equipped as ambulance, workshop, command and control, military communications, military police, transport, reconnaissance, ground and air radar, sound surveillance and armed version.

Armed
40.13H it was presented as armed version in 2017 Partner defense fair with  Zastava automatic 30mm grenade launcher M-93 or in same configuration could be armed with Zastava M02 Coyote 12.7 heavy machine gun. It is also presented in Partner 2017 fair by Yugoimport that at request from buyer it is possible to purchase additionally armed version with stronger engine (due to modular design it could use engines of different manufacturers and with different power). It is also possible to equip Zastava NTV with remote control weapons station M-15  and as options other weapons could be mounted like with turret mount rocket launcher system for light missiles such as GHIBKA 3M-47 for Igla or Strela 2 and Strela 10 missiles or anti-tank missiles such is Mayutka or Kornet.

Operators
  – 10 in the Serbian Armed Forces.

See also
Iveco LMV
Toyota Mega Cruiser
URO VAMTAC
Tigr (Russian military vehicle)
Nimr

References

All-wheel-drive vehicles
Military light utility vehicles
Military Technical Institute Belgrade
Military vehicles introduced in the 2010s
Off-road vehicles
Military vehicles of Serbia